Xiaohongmen Station is a Subway station on the Yizhuang Line of the Beijing Subway.

Station layout 
The station has an underground island platform.

Exits 
There are 3 exits, lettered A, B, and D. Exit A is accessible.

References

External links

Beijing Subway stations in Chaoyang District
Railway stations in China opened in 2010